Stuart William Gill  (born 6 August 1958) is a British diplomat who is High Commissioner to the Republic of Malta.

Education
Gill graduated from the University of Kent in 1980, with a degree in Politics and Government.

Career
Gill began his career in the UK Government's Department for Trade and Industry, before moving to the Foreign and Commonwealth Office in 1994. From 2008 to 2012, Stuart was Consul-General in, Melbourne, Australia, where he had consular and commercial responsibility for Victoria, South Australia and Tasmania. In 2012, Gill was appointed as Her Majesty's Ambassador to the Republic of Iceland. In 2016 he was transferred to be High Commissioner to the Malta.

Gill was appointed Officer of the Order of the British Empire (OBE) in the 2016 Birthday Honours for services to foreign policy.

Publication
Blood in the Sea: HMS Dunedin and the Enigma Code, Weidenfeld & Nicolson, 2003

References

1958 births
Living people
Alumni of the University of Kent
Ambassadors of the United Kingdom to Iceland
High Commissioners of the United Kingdom to Malta
Officers of the Order of the British Empire